Ann Rosemary Sayer (16 October 1936 – 15 April 2020) was an English long-distance walker and rower. Sayer rowed for Great Britain at the Women's European Rowing Championships in 1960, 1962 and 1964. In 1977, she became the first woman to qualify as a Centurion, walking 100 miles in under 24 hours. In 1980 she set a still unbroken record for the fastest ever walk by a woman from Land's End to John o' Groats.

References

1936 births
2020 deaths
Long distance walkers
English female racewalkers
English racewalkers
English female rowers